The 1894 Carlisle Indians football team represented the Carlisle Indian Industrial School as an independent during the 1894 college football season. Led by first-year head coach Vance C. McCormick, the Indians compiled a record of 1–6–2.

Schedule

References

Carlisle
Carlisle Indians football seasons
Carlisle Indians football